The transport sector comprises the physical infrastructure, docks and vehicle, terminals, fleets, ancillary equipment and service delivery of all the various modes of transport operating in Guyana. The transport services, transport agencies providing these services, the organizations and people who plan, build, maintain, and operate the system, and the policies that mold its development.

City transportation

Public transport around Guyana's capital Georgetown is provided by privately owned mini buses which operate in allocated zones for which there is a well-regulated fare structure. This arrangement extends to all mini bus routes throughout the country. There are designated bus stops for mini buses for most routes but some buses still pick up passengers at virtually any point on their routes. This practice often poses a serious inconvenience to other vehicles by disrupting the normal flow of traffic.

Taxis have freer movement around the city and into rural areas. Their fare, while generally standard, is less regulated. Starting in 2010, all taxis must be painted yellow, a regulation designed to protect consumers and to distinguish the vehicles from others that are often used in committing crimes. All taxis are registered under the term "Hackney Carriage" and carry the letter H at the beginning of their number plates. There are scores of taxi services operating in Georgetown but its equally easy to "flag a ride" in the central business district.

The network of routes has a number of identifiable starting points which are concentrated in the Stabroek area and along the Avenue of the Republic between Croal and Robb Streets.

Road conditions vary immensely, and maintenance is sometimes deficient.  In 2006 there was one operational set of traffic lights but in July 2007, a modern system was installed by Indian firm CMS Traffic Systems Limited, through a US$2.1 million line of credit to the government from India's EXIM Bank, providing signals for both vehicular and pedestrian traffic at all major intersections in Georgetown.

Minibuses in Guyana

As of February 2016, there were 19 minibus routes in Guyana  and most of them begin or are fully contained in Georgetown, Guyana. 

In 2015, the Ministry of Public Works estimated that 60 percent of Guyana’s productive labour force used public transportation daily, which is widely available and fairly reliable. 
They also stated that the eight major bus routes, 31, 32, 40, 41, 42, 43, 44 and 45, accounted for 67 percent of the total public bus fleet in Guyana. Their survey found that 41% of commuters on the major routes were satisfied.

Long distance transportation

Roads Place names along Guyana's roads

The remaining 56 percent (2,235 kilometers) is composed of interior roads and trails. Most access roads are in poor condition. However, the Central Government has targeted several roads for complete rehabilitation, and already many have been rehabilitated.

The main coastal roads are, from west to east, the Essequibo Coast Road, the Parika to Vreed en Hoop Road, the East Coast Demerara and West Coast Berbice Roads, and the Corentyne Highway from New Amsterdam to Moleson Creek (86 kilometers). All these roads are paved and their speed limit vary between 50–100 km/h.

South of Georgetown the primary road is the East Bank Demerara Road, a four-lane road from Rumiveldt to Providence and two-lane from Providence to Timehri Georgetown to Timehri, where the Cheddi Jagan International Airport - Timehri (CJIAT) is located.

Between 1966 and 1968, Soesdyke, located on the East Bank Demerara Road, was connected to Mackenzie by a modern two lane highway, called the Soesdyke-Linden Highway. This road was constructed as a section of a highway connecting Georgetown with Lethem. In 1968 a bridge was built across the Demerara River at Linden, and, in 1974, it was decided that the route to Lethem would cross the Demerara River at Linden and go south, along the watershed of the Demerara and Essequibo Rivers, through Mabura, to Kurupukari. From Kurupukari it would run parallel to the old cattle trail to Annai, and from Annai it would follow an already existing road to Lethem.

In the early 1970s a two-lane road with modern geometry and surfaced with laterite was built between Linden and Rockstone. This road was later connected to Mabura and Kurupukari. In 1990-91 a two-lane laterite road was constructed between Kurupukari and Annai and a vehicle ferry installed at Kurupukari. Since there was already an existing road between Mabura and Kurupukari, and between Annai and Lethem, it was now possible for vehicles to travel between Georgetown and Lethem.

In the period 1974 to 1978, an attempt was made to build a road between Rockstone and Kurupung to facilitate the construction of a large hydroelectric station. From Rockstone it headed north to Suribanna, where a pontoon ferry was installed across the Essequibo River to Sherima. From Sherima the road went westward, intersecting the Bartica - Mahdia Road at Allsopp Point  from Bartica. From Allsopp Point the road followed the existing road towards Bartica and branched off  from Bartica going to Teperu in the lower reaches on the Mazaruni River. At Teperu a pontoon ferry was installed across the Mazaruni River to Itaballi. From Itaballi the road went westward to Peter's Mine on the Puruni River. From Peter's Mine the road continued as a penetration road to Kurupung. This road is referred to as the UMDA Road.

There is in addition a hinterland east-west main road system that extends from Kwakwani in the east, through Ituni, Linden, Rockstone, Sherima to Bartica in the west. Linden is therefore one of the main hubs for road transportation in the hinterland.

Outside the existing main roads there are several other interior roads or trails that comprise approximately 1,570 kilometers. Most of those roads are unpaved, and will deteriorate if maintenance remains inadequate. They are found mostly in the hinterland and riverain areas and provide linkages with a number of important mining and forestry activities thus facilitating transportation between the mining and forestry communities and the more developed coastal areas. Parts of this road/trail network can be developed into an arterial road system linking the hinterland communities with each other and to the main road network. It is estimated that roads carry 80 percent of Guyana's passenger traffic and about 33 percent of its freight.

Commuters to West Demerara have a choice of road transport via the Demerara Harbour Bridge or by the Demerara River ferry from the Stabroek Stelling to Vreed en Hoop, which is obliquely opposite.

The highway that begins on the West Coast of Demerara is heavily trafficked since it provides a link to Parika on the East Bank of the Essequibo River, which has become an important center of economic activity in the Essequibo region.

It is now possible to travel overland to Suriname by taking the ferry on the Guyana side at Moleson Creek and crossing the Corentyne River over to Suriname at South Drain. While travel to Brazil is via the old cattle trail it has been upgraded into a fair weather track that passes through the bauxite-producing town of Linden and ending at Lethem.

Bridges
 The coastal main road system is not continuous. There are gaps whenever it intersects the Essequibo, Demerara and Berbice Rivers. People and goods move across these gaps by ferry systems as well as the Demerara Harbour Bridge (DHB) and the Berbice Bridge.

In addition, across the shipping channel, there are two spans which retract to permit the passage of ocean-going vessels. From mid-1998 toll revenue has been credited to the account of the DHB and not to the Government of Guyana, as it was until then. This is a step towards the establishment of the DHB as an autonomous statutory authority. At present the toll revenue does not meet the operational and maintenance costs of the bridge; the government of Guyana provides considerable subsidy for its upkeep. The bridge has been in existence since 1978 and currently notwithstanding the rigorous maintenance regime, sits at the end of its useful life.

In 2007, construction resumed on the Takutu River Bridge to link Guyana and Brazil in the southwest region of Guyana near Lethem. The bridge was officially opened on September 14, 2009, enabling economic interests in northern Brazil to link by road to the port at Georgetown. Unprecedented construction and population growth in Lethem since the bridge's opening reflects the significantly increased traffic and movement of goods facilitated by the bridge. The Takutu Bridge is seen as the first of several joint projects between Guyana and Brazil intended to facilitate cargo traffic: Brazil is expected to subsidize the paving of the Lethem-to-Georgetown road, a development that would have profound impacts on the area's economy and environment. Dredging of the Georgetown port to accommodate deeper-draft cargo  vessels is also being planned.

Rail transport
Commercial railway services for both passengers and cargo were operated until 1974. Two lines operated - the Demerara-Essequibo Railway, from Vreed en Hoop to Parika and the Demerara-Berbice Railway, from Georgetown to Rosignol. With the upgrading of the West Coast Demerara/East Bank Essequibo and the East Coast Demerara/West Coast Berbice roadways, the Government decided in the mid-1970s to cease operating the railway services, which were being run at a loss. In the Matthew's Ridge area, there is a  railway service.

A railway service was once operated in Linden for the movement of bauxite ore. However trucks are now used to transport the bauxite ore.

Water transport

It is generally agreed that, for the movement of bulky low-value goods over great distances, water transport is cheapest. This is especially true in Guyana, where the road infrastructure is poorly advanced. Moreover, with the widespread decentralization of economic activity that is being proposed by the government, and with the corresponding development of the interior regions of the country, the demand for water transport might, perhaps paradoxically, increase rather than diminish.

The infrastructure that supports water transport in Guyana is located along the banks of the navigable rivers, namely, the Essequibo River, Demerara River and Berbice River. In addition to the wharves and stellings that provide coastal and inland linkages, there are facilities that handle both the country's overseas and local shipping requirements.

Virtually all exports and imports are transported by sea. The main port of Georgetown, located at the mouth of the Demerara River, comprises several wharves, most of which are privately owned. In addition, three berths are available for oceangoing vessels at Linden.

Guyana's foreign trade is handled by foreign shipping companies. The largest bulk exports are bauxite and sugar, and the largest volume imports are petroleum and wheat flour. Other important break-bulk exports include rice and timber.

Containers are used but because they are not part of the internal transport system, they are loaded and unloaded at the ports.

Internal barge transport is important for bauxite, sugar, rice and aggregates. In the case of sugar, for example, 98 percent of exports is delivered by barge to the port of Georgetown for export. Rivers are used for moving logs and account also for a significant share of those persons who travel to the interior.

It is estimated that about 1,000 kilometers of waterways in Guyana are utilized for commerce in Guyana. In addition, drainage canals are important transport channels for collecting sugar on the estates and for personal travel.

Ferries

Ferry services link the primary roads in the coastal area, and Guyana with Suriname. The Government's Transport an hid Harbour Department provides scheduled ferry services in the Essequibo and Demerara rivers. Small privately owned river-craft supplement these services. Since the opening of the Berbice River Bridge in December 2008 the Transport and Harbour Department has reduced its service to only one round trip daily between Rosignol and New Amsterdam.

Currently the only ferry service consistently showing profit is The Parika-Adventure.  Service for the remainder, in particular The North West services, the Government provides a cross-subsidy funded out of the profits that are always realized by the Harbor Branch of the Transport and Harbors Department. Nevertheless, ferry operations have the potential to be profitable, provided that capital investments are made to improve their physical assets. With the establishment of a Maritime Administration and subsequently a National Sea Ports Authority the ferry operations may be privatized or operated as a commercially viable autonomous agency.

There is also a ferry linking Guyana and Suriname crossing the Corentyne River from Springlands (at Corriverton in Guyana) to Nieuw Nickerie, a town in Suriname. Leaving Rosignol at 8:00hrs and now at 14:30hrs respectively.  This service is primarily geared at offsetting the high cost for crossing the Berbice Bridge for school children, public servants and the elderly.

Ultimately, key ferry links were to be replaced with bridges, starting with one from Rosignol to New Amsterdam across the Berbice River.

At the end of 1999 the fleet of ferry vessels owned by the Transport and Harbors Department comprised nine motor vessels, six of which ranged in age from 15 to 55 years. Indeed, two of the vessels were over fifty years of age, and three over 30 years, with an average age of thirty-five. They are in almost continuous need of repair.

Air transportation

Air transportation for business and pleasure is readily available for traveling to many parts of the hinterland.

Air transport plays a vital role in the development of Guyana. Within the country, it provides a link between the coastal areas and communities in the hinterland, many of which are inaccessible by any other means of transportation. Thus, the economic and social well being of these areas and their integration into the fabric of the nation are critically dependent on the availability of air transport. Externally, passengers are moved to and from the country almost entirely by air. In addition, the potential of this mode of transport for the carriage of cargo, especially exports, continues to increase.

The first airplane flight took place in Guyana in March 1913 when George Schmidt, a German, flew a machine over Georgetown, taking off from the Bel Air Park Race Course.

In September 1929, the first airmail service to Guyana began.

The famous American flier, Colonel Charles Lindbergh, arrived in the Demerara River with his flying boat (an amphibian craft) on September 22, 1929. The first regular flights to the interior started in 1939.

Although air transport in Guyana had its beginnings in the 1920s when the first "bush" services were introduced, Government's earnest participation can be dated from 1947 when a Director of Civil Aviation was appointed to regulate the industry. Regular shipments of beef from the Rupununi to Georgetown by air began on 9 July 1948. Amphibian aircraft have been vital to the development of the country as they are able land both on airstrips and on water.

The development of air transport in Guyana owes much to Arthur "Art" James Williams, a pilot and mechanic from the United States. He arrived in British Guiana in August 1934, and returned to the United States in October 1955. Over this period, except for the war years, during which he served with the United States Air Force, he developed British Guiana Airways Ltd. (registered 27 May 1938) and operating regular internal services since 1939.

On 15 July 1955, the Government purchased British Guiana Airways. However, external services continued to be supplied almost exclusively by foreign airlines until Guyana Airways Corporation commenced regional air services in 1979. Subsequently, restrictions on the repatriation of profits in foreign exchange and other circumstances contributed to the withdrawal of services to Guyana by foreign airlines, with the exception of BWIA. Guyana Airways Corporation was therefore obliged to fill the breach by commencing jet operations to Miami and New York in the US and Toronto, Ontario in Canada.

In the 1980s Guyana Airways Corporation's domestic operations started to deteriorate for a number of reasons, not least among them the unrealistically low fares it was required to charge and the lack of access to foreign exchange for imported aircraft parts and other requirements. The private sector therefore began to fill the gap and by 1991 three major domestic charter operators had emerged. In the meantime, Guyana Airways Corporation's domestic service continued to deteriorate and, by 1993, possessed only one Twin Otter DHC-6 to service the entire country. Under new management it was revitalized and saw a partial return to its original domestic role with the reintroduction of several domestic scheduled routes, because of the addition of two Shorts Skyvan SC7 aircraft, and a second Twin Otter DHC-6 aircraft.

In 2010, the International Civil Aviation Organization (ICAO) conferred "international" status to the air terminal at Ogle (IATA: OGL, ICAO: SYGO), a former sugarcane airstrip just a few kilometres south of Georgetown's center. In anticipation of increased regional air traffic to the facility, an EU-subsidized construction project began in January of that year, intended to upgrade the terminal building and extend the primary paved runway to a usable length of 4000 feet. Ogle is the hub for domestic flights to Guyana's interior and offers once-daily service to the in-town airstrip in Paramaribo, capital of neighboring Suriname.

Challenges and future development

The gross inadequacy of Guyana's transportation system militates against its social and economic development in several ways. First, it increases production costs and, therefore, reduces competitiveness, particularly in the mining and forestry sectors. Second, it inhibits the capacity to fully utilise those natural resources (gold, timber, diamonds, soils suitable for agriculture) that are not located on the coastland. Third, by severely limiting communication between those who live on the coast and those who inhabit the hinterland, it effectively divides the country into two almost unbridgeable cultures. Fourth, it acts as a barrier to the unity of the country in both a physical and spiritual sense: because they are not unified physically, Guyanese seem to find it difficult to think as Guyanese, to act as if they are one nation. Fifth, it restricts the coastal population's penetration of the interior, and forces coastlanders to live in a cramped and crowded manner on the coast, struggling and competing for land-space and other amenities, while more suitable areas are available farther south. And sixth, failure to occupy the greater part of the country, might tend to bolster some of the claims of Guyana's neighbours to its territory.

The government of Guyana and Brazil signed a Memorandum of Understanding in 2012 to explore the development of Hydro Power, Linden-Lethem Road and Deep Water Harbour to boost bilateral trade and cooperation. This network would have enabled easy access by road to the neighbouring countries of Brazil, Venezuela and Surinam; reduced the costs of utilising the country's timber and natural resources, thus making them more competitive in international markets; diversified agricultural development by making more easily available suitable areas in the hinterland, particularly in the Intermediate and Rupununi savannahs; relieved the over-crowded coastland of a significant proportion of its population, thus improving the quality of life of the inhabitants of both the coastal and interior areas; and made more feasible the equitable distribution of economic activity, not only in the agricultural but also in the manufacturing and small- industries sector.

A high-span fixed bridge is currently being studied to replace the existing DHB; a series of bridges and causeways linking the islands in the mouth of the Essequibo River to Morasi on the East Bank and Supenaam on the West Bank; and another high-span bridge across the Essequibo River at Monkey Jump.

Construction of a bridge across the Berbice River at Crab Island and D'Edwards on the East and West banks of Berbice River was completed in 2008.

In 2012, The Government of Guyana signed a contract with CHEC of China for the expansion of the runway at the CJIA and the construction of a modern terminal building at an estimated cost of 131Million US Dollars. Moreover, the airstrip at Timehri Airport would have been extended, and the entire Airport refurbished to accommodate an increasing number of passengers. The airport at Ogle would have been privatised, and much improved and extended.

Statistics

Railways
Total:
187 km (all dedicated to ore transport)
Standard gauge:
139 km; 
Narrow gauge:
48 km;  gauge

Highways
Total:
7,970 km
Paved:
590 km
Unpaved:
7,380 km (1996 est.)
 Driving is on the left, a practice inherited from United Kingdom colonial authorities. Guyana and Suriname are the only two countries on the (in-land) American continent who still drive on the left.

Waterways
Guyana has  total of navigable waterways; Berbice River, Demerara River, and Essequibo River are navigable by oceangoing vessels for  respectively.

Seaports and harbors
 Bartica
 Georgetown
 Linden
 New Amsterdam
 Parika

Merchant marine
total:
1 ship ( or over) totaling /
ships by type: (1999 est.)
 cargo ship 1

Airports
51 (1999 est.)

International Airport: Cheddi Jagan International Airport

Other Major Airport/s: Eugene F. Correira International Airport

Airports - with paved runways:
total:
9
1,524 to 2,437 m:
2
914 to 1,523 m:
1
under 914 m:
2 (1999 est.)

Airports - with unpaved runways:
total:
84
1,524 to 2,437 m:
2
914 to 1,523 m:
7
under 914 m:
37 (1999 est.)

See also
 Rail transport by country
 Proposed high-speed rail by country

Notes

References
50 Years of Flying in Guyana by H.S. Burrowes.
Railways of the Caribbean by David Rollinson (2001, Macmillan, Oxford England)

External links

 
History of Guyana